Liisa Repo-Martell is a Canadian actress and artist.
Her parents Satu Repo and George Martell were founding editors of This Magazine Is About Schools, an influential independent Canadian magazine now known as "This".

Liisa grew up in Toronto and attended Jarvis Collegiate Institute in the mid-1980s.

Her Gemini award was for her 1998 performance in Nights Below Station Street.
She has had two other Gemini nominations for appearances on This is Wonderland and Flashpoint.

She played Mrs. Genest, estranged wife of Joe Genest (Stephen Baldwin) in the 2006 Jesse Stone: Night Passage made-for-TV-movie.

In February 2012 the National Post called Repo-Martell, and her husband, actor and theatre-director Chris Abraham, a "Toronto theatre power couple".

She currently portrays Reginald Hargreeves wife Abigail in seasons 1, 3 & 4 of The Umbrella Academy

Filmography

Film

Television

References

External links
 

Canadian film actresses
Canadian people of Finnish descent
Canadian Screen Award winners
1971 births
Living people
Actresses from Toronto